Austrotengella is a genus of Australian false wolf spiders that was first described by Robert John Raven in 2012.

Species
 it contains six species, found in New South Wales and Queensland:
Austrotengella hackerae Raven, 2012 – Australia (Queensland)
Austrotengella hebronae Raven, 2012 – Australia (New South Wales)
Austrotengella monteithi Raven, 2012 – Australia (Queensland)
Austrotengella plimeri Raven, 2012 – Australia (New South Wales)
Austrotengella toddae Raven, 2012 (type) – Australia (Queensland, New South Wales)
Austrotengella wrighti Raven, 2012 – Australia (Queensland, New South Wales)

See also
 List of Zoropsidae species

References

Araneomorphae genera
Spiders of Australia
Zoropsidae